is a passenger railway station located in Asahi-ku, Yokohama, Japan, operated by the private railway operator Sagami Railway (Sotetsu).

Lines 
Minami-Makigahara Station is served by the Sagami Railway Izumino Line, and lies 1.6 kilometers from the starting point of the line at Futamatagawa Station.

Station layout
The station consists of two opposed side platforms serving two tracks, with the station building elevated, and built on top of the platforms and tracks.

Platforms

Adjacent stations

History 
Minami-Makigahara Station was opened on April 8, 1976.

Passenger statistics
In fiscal 2019, the station was used by an average of 11,732 passengers daily.

The passenger figures for previous years are as shown below.

Surrounding area
 Children's Nature Park
Yokohama District Legal Affairs Bureau Asahi Branch Office
Yokohama Makigahara Elementary School
Yokohama City Sachigaoka Elementary School

See also
 List of railway stations in Japan

References

External links 

 Official home page  

Railway stations in Kanagawa Prefecture
Railway stations in Japan opened in 1976
Railway stations in Yokohama